The Orange Suit is a 2012 film by the Iranian director Dariush Mehrjui. Mehrjui also co-wrote the script with Vahidéa Mohammadi. The film was lensed by Farrokh Majidi and starred Hamed Behdad, Homayoun Ershadi, Kianoosh Gerami, Mitra Hajjar and Leila Hatami.

Cast

Awards and nomination

References

External links
 

Iranian comedy-drama films
2012 films
Films directed by Dariush Mehrjui